Wolf Entertainment is an American television production company founded in 1988 by producer Dick Wolf, known for its television franchises Law & Order,  Chicago, and FBI. 

In February 2020, Wolf Entertainment signed one of the largest deals in television history. The nine-figure deal, which spans broadcast and streaming, keeps the company and its high-profile projects at Universal Television, the company's long-time home, for an additional five years.

Originally named Wolf Films, the company was rebranded to Wolf Entertainment in 2019. As of July 2021, the company had produced around 1900 hours of television and received 94 Emmy nominations.

Television
Wolf Entertainment dominates prime-time network television in the United States, with full-night lineups on both NBC and CBS. Current series include  FBI, FBI: Most Wanted and FBI: International (Tuesdays), Chicago Fire, Chicago P.D., and Chicago Med (Wednesdays), Law & Order, Law & Order: Special Victims Unit, and Law & Order: Organized Crime (Thursdays).

In 2021, Wolf Entertainment became part of the conversation around depictions of policing in the media. In a conversation with fellow Wolf Entertainment star Julian McMahon on Wolf Entertainment's YouTube page, Chicago P.D. star Jason Beghe explained "I think we feel a certain sense of responsibility to address these issues, which is fun and challenging. Thankfully we have some good writers and good advisers."

Streaming 
In 2022, Wolf Entertainment will dip its toes into the streaming world with its new series On Call. The half-hour drama series, which will follow a veteran and rookie police officer in Long Beach, California, was picked up by Amazon's Freevee. The series is a joint production with ATTN: and Universal Television.

Podcasts
In 2019, Wolf Entertainment ventured into the podcast space, launching "The Squadroom", a Law & Order: Special Victims Unit companion show.

Additionally, Wolf premiered a scripted podcast called "Hunted" starring Parker Posey in the fall of 2019. The podcast, which was touted as the first of many upcoming podcasts from the production company, was executive produced by the company's Head of Digital, Elliot Wolf.

People
 Dick Wolf, Chairman & CEO
 Peter Jankowski, President & COO
 Arthur W. Forney, Head of Post Production
 Elliot Wolf, Head of Digital
 Tom Thayer, Head of Unscripted Series
 Anastasia Puglisi, SVP of Scripted Series

Filmography

Scripted

Unscripted

References

External links 
 Official website

Television production companies of the United States
American companies established in 1990
1990 establishments in California